The Big Night may refer to:

 The Big Night (1951 film), a film directed by Joseph Losey
 Bad Girls Don't Cry, a 1959 film directed by Mauro Bolognini
 The Big Night (1960 film), a film directed by Sidney Salkow
 The Big Night (1976 film), a film directed by Francis Reusser

See also
Big Night, a 1996 American comedy-drama film directed by Campbell Scott and Stanley Tucci
 Big Night (album), a 2014 album by British-Australian singer-songwriter Peter Andre
 "Big Night", a song by Big Time Rush from the 2010 album BTR
 The Big Night In, a 2020 telethon in the United Kingdom